Kitasatospora aureofaciens is a species of Kitasatospora, and the source of many tetracycline antibiotics. The organism was first isolated at Sanborn Field on the University of Missouri campus in Columbia, Missouri, US; the site became a National Historic Landmark.

References

External links
Type strain of Streptomyces aureofaciens at BacDive -  the Bacterial Diversity Metadatabase

Streptomycineae